The Canterville Ghost is a fantasy, comedy short story by Oscar Wilde published in February 1887.

The Canterville Ghost may also refer to the following adaptations:

Film and TV
The Canterville Ghost (1944 film), 1944 American film directed by Jules Dassin
The Canterville Ghost (1985 film), 1985 American film directed by William F. Claxton
The Canterville Ghost (1986 film), 1986 American television film directed by Paul Bogart
The Canterville Ghost (1996 film), 1996 American television film directed by Sydney Macartney
The Canterville Ghost (2016 film), 2016 film directed by Yann Samuell
The Canterville Ghost (2021 TV series), 2021 British BBC Studios and American BYUtv television series

Musical
The Canterville Ghost (Knaifel opera), 1966 opera composed by Alexander Knaifel
The Canterville Ghost (Getty opera)
The Canterville Ghost (stage musical), 1995 stage musical by Peter Quilter and Charles Miller

See also
The Canterville Ghost#Adaptations
Bhoothnath, 2008 Indian film adaptation